Local elections were held in Pasay on May 8, 1995 within the Philippine general election. The voters elected for the elective local posts in the city: the mayor, vice mayor, the representative for the lone district, and the councilors, six of them in the two districts of the city.

Background 
Mayor Pablo Cuneta ran for re-election.

Vice Mayor Wenceslao Trinidad ran for re-election.

Rep. Jovito Claudio ran for re-election.

Candidates

Team Cuneta-Trinidad

Team Briones-Arceo-Claudio

Results 
Names written in bold-Italic are the re-elected incumbents while in italic are incumbents lost in elections.

For Representative 
Representative Jovito Claudio was re-elected.

For Mayor 
Mayor Pablo Cuneta was re-elected.

For Vice Mayor 
Vice Mayor Wenceslao Trinidad was re-elected.

First District 
Three of the six incumbents were re-elected. Newly-elected councilors were Antonino Calixto, son of former Vice Mayor and Acting Mayor Eduardo Calixto who placed 1st, Teodulo Lorca Jr. who placed 5th, and Eduardo Advincula who placed 6th.

|-bgcolor=black
|colspan=5|

Second District 
Four of the six incumbents were re-elected. Newly-elected councilors were Emmanuel Ibay and Reynaldo Padua.

|-bgcolor=black
|colspan=5|

Note 
Due to limited or no source for this election online, no citations has made.

The main sources are the old election results that may be kept by the local election precinct of the city.

Pasay
Elections in Pasay